is a cover album by Masami Okui.

Information
To commemorate her 10th anniversary since her debut in 1993, Masami Okui sang cover versions of 10 famous anime songs.
It was first released on 1 May 2003 as a limited release and became very rare after a while. 2 years later, the album was re-released to public.

Track listing

Anime television series Cutie Honey opening theme
Lyrics: Cloud Q
Composition: Takeo Watanabe
Arrangement: Hideyuki Daichi Suzuki
Give a reason
Anime television series Slayers Next opening theme
Lyrics: Satomi Arimori
Composition: Hidetoshi Sato
Arrangement: Tsutomu Ohira
Truth
Anime television series Revolutionary Girl Utena ending theme
Lyrics: Shoko Fujibayashi
Composition: Riki Arai
Arrangement: Hirama Akihiko
Love squall
Anime television series Lupin III ending theme
Lyrics: Sanaho Maki
Composition: Yuji Ohno
Arrangement: DRY

Anime television series Neon Genesis Evangelion opening theme
Lyrics: Neko Oikawa
Composition: Hidetoshi Sato
Arrangement: Toshiyuki Omori
Successful Mission
Anime television series Saber Marionette J opening theme
Lyrics: MEGUMI
Composition: Hidetoshi Sato
Arrangement: Toshiro Yabuki
Ghost Sweeper
Anime television series Ghost Sweeper Mikami opening theme
Lyrics: Satomi Arimori
Composition: Toshiyuki Omori
Arrangement: Masaki Iwamoto

Anime television series Lupin III ending theme
Lyrics: Kazuya Senge
Composition: Yuji Ohno
Arrangement: Hideyuki Daichi Suzuki

Movie anime Evangelion: Death and Rebirth theme song
Lyrics: Neko Oikawa
Composition, arrangement: Toshiyuki Omori
 Northern lights
Anime television series Shaman King opening theme
Lyrics: MEGUMI
Composition, arrangement: Gou Takahashi
 You get to burning
Anime television series Martian Successor Nadesico opening theme
Lyrics: Satomi Arimori
Composition, arrangement: Toshiyuki Omori

Anime television series Devilman ending theme
Lyrics: Yū Aku
Composition: Shunichi Tokura
Arrangement: Monta

Sources
Official website: Makusonia

2003 albums
Masami Okui albums